was a Japanese magazine published by Jitsugyo no Nihon Sha from February 1908 to June 1955. It featured early shōjo manga-style imagery, and work by Takuboku Ishikawa, Katsuji Matsumoto, Jun'ichi Nakahara, and Akiko Yosano.

References

Further reading
Hiromi Tsuchiya Dollase, "Girls on the Home Front: An Examination of Shōjo no tomo Magazine 1937–1945" in Asian Studies Review, 09/2008; 32:323-339. 

1908 establishments in Japan
1955 disestablishments in Japan
Defunct women's magazines published in Japan
Fashion magazines published in Japan
Jitsugyo no Nihon Sha manga
Magazines established in 1908
Magazines disestablished in 1955
Monthly manga magazines published in Japan
Shōjo manga
Teen magazines published in Japan
Women's fashion magazines